A confederation (also known as a confederacy or league) is a union of sovereign groups or states united for purposes of common action. Usually created by a treaty, confederations of states tend to be established for dealing with critical issues, such as defence, foreign relations, internal trade or currency, with the central government being required to provide support for all its members. Confederalism represents a main form of intergovernmentalism, defined as any form of interaction around states that takes place on the basis of sovereign independence or government.

The nature of the relationship among the member states constituting a confederation varies considerably. Likewise, the relationship between the member states and the general government and their distribution of powers varies. Some looser confederations are similar to international organisations. Other confederations with stricter rules may resemble federal systems.

Since the member states of a confederation retain their sovereignty, they have an implicit right of secession. The political philosopher Emmerich de Vattel said: "Several sovereign and independent states may unite themselves together by a perpetual confederacy without each, in particular, ceasing to be a perfect state.... The deliberations in common will offer no violence to the sovereignty of each member".

Under a confederation, compared to a federal state, the central authority is relatively weak. Decisions made by the general government in a unicameral legislature, a council of the member states, require subsequent implementation by the member states to take effect; they are not laws acting directly upon the individual but have more the character of interstate agreements. Also, decision-making in the general government usually proceeds by consensus (unanimity), not by the majority. Historically, those features limit the union's effectiveness. Hence, political pressure tends to build over time for the transition to a federal system of government, as in the American, Swiss and German cases of regional integration.

Confederated states

In terms of internal structure, every confederal state is composed of two or more constituent states, referred to as confederated states. Regarding their political systems, confederated states can have republican or monarchical forms of government. Those that have a republican form (confederated republics) are usually called states (like states of the American Confederacy, 1861-1865) or republics (like republics of Serbia and Montenegro within the former State Union of Serbia and Montenegro, 2003-2006). Those that have a monarchical form of government (confederated monarchies) are defined by various hierarchical ranks (like kingdoms of Iraq and Jordan within the Hashemite Arab Union in 1958).

Examples

Belgium
Many scholars have claimed that the Kingdom of Belgium, a country with a complicated federal structure has adopted some characteristics of a confederation under the pressure of separatist movements, especially in Flanders. For example, C. E. Lagasse declared that Belgium was "near the political system of a Confederation" regarding the constitutional reform agreements between Belgian Regions and between Communities, and the director of the Centre de recherche et d'information socio-politiques (CRISP) Vincent de Coorebyter called Belgium "undoubtedly a federation...[with] some aspects of a confederation" in Le Soir. Also in Le Soir, Professor Michel Quévit of the Catholic University of Leuven wrote that the "Belgian political system is already in dynamics of a Confederation".

Nevertheless, the Belgian regions and the linguistic communities do not have the autonomy to leave the Belgian state. As such, federal aspects still dominate. Also, for fiscal policy and public finances, the federal state dominates the other levels of government.

The increasingly-confederal aspects of the Belgian Federal State appear to be a political reflection of the profound cultural, sociological and economic differences between the Flemish (Belgians who speak Dutch or Dutch dialects) and the Walloons (Belgians who speak French or French dialects). For example, in the last several decades, over 95% of Belgians have voted for political parties that represent voters from only one community, the separatist N-VA being the party with the most voter support among the Flemish population. Parties that strongly advocate Belgian unity and appeal to voters of both communities usually play only a marginal role in nationwide general elections. The system in Belgium is known as consociationalism.

That makes Belgium fundamentally different from federal countries like Switzerland, Canada, Germany and Australia. National parties receive over 90% of voter support in those countries. The only geographical areas comparable with Belgium within Europe are Catalonia, the Basque Country (both part of Spain), Northern Ireland and Scotland (both part of the United Kingdom) and parts of Italy, where a massive voter turnout for regional (and often separatist) political parties has become the rule in the last decades, and nationwide parties advocating national unity draw around half or sometimes less of the votes.

Benelux
The Benelux is a politico-economic union of the states of Belgium, the Netherlands, and Luxembourg bound through treaties and based on consensus between the representatives of the member states.

They partially share a common foreign policy, especially in regards to their navies through the BeNeSam. The Dutch defence minister (2010-2012) Hans Hillen even said on Belgian radio that it is not impossible that the three armed forces of the member-states could be integrated into "Benelux Armed Forces" one day.

Because of this the Benelux is sometimes labeled as a "kind of confederation" by, for example; Belgian Minister of State Mark Eyskens.

Canada

In Canada, the word confederation has an additional unrelated meaning. "Confederation" refers to the process of (or the event of) establishing or joining the Canadian federal state.

In modern terminology, Canada is a federation, not a confederation. However, to contemporaries of the Constitution Act, 1867, confederation did not have the same connotation of a weakly-centralized federation. Canadian Confederation generally refers to the Constitution Act, 1867, which formed the Dominion of Canada from three of the colonies of British North America, and to the subsequent incorporation of other colonies and territories. Beginning on 1 July 1867, it was initially a self-governing dominion of the British Empire with a  federal structure, whose government was led by Sir John A. Macdonald. The initial colonies involved were the Province of Canada (becoming Quebec from Canada East, formerly the colony of Lower Canada; and Ontario from Canada West, formerly the colony of Upper Canada), Nova Scotia, and New Brunswick. Later participants were Manitoba, British Columbia, Prince Edward Island, Alberta and Saskatchewan (the latter two created in 1905 as federated provinces from parts of the directly federally administered Northwest Territories, first transferred to the Dominion in 1869 and now possessing devolved governments as itself, Yukon and Nunavut), and finally Newfoundland (now Newfoundland and Labrador) in 1949. Canada is an unusually decentralized federal state, not a confederate association of sovereign states, the usual meaning of confederation in modern terms. A Canadian judicial constitutional interpretation, Reference Re Secession of Quebec, and a subsequent federal law, set forth negotiating conditions for a Canadian province (though not a territory) to leave the Canadian federal state (addressed also by a related Quebec law). Importantly, negotiation would first need triggering by referendum and executing by constitutional amendment using a current amending mechanism of Canada's constitution—meaning that, while not legal under the current constitution, it is democratically feasible without resorting to extralegal means or international involvement.

European Union
Its unique nature and the political sensitivities surrounding it cause there to be no common or legal classification for the European Union (EU). However, it bears some resemblance to both a confederation (or a "new" type of confederation) and a federation. The term supranational union has also been applied. The EU operates common economic policies with hundreds of common laws, which enable a single economic market, a common customs territory, (mainly) open internal borders, and a common currency among most member-states. However, unlike a federation, the EU does not have exclusive powers over foreign affairs, defence, and taxation. Furthermore, most EU laws, which have been developed by consensus between relevant national government ministers and then scrutinised and approved or rejected by the European Parliament, must be transposed into national law by national parliaments. Most collective decisions by member states are taken by weighted majorities and blocking minorities typical of upper houses in federations. On the other hand, the absolute unanimity typical of intergovernmentalism is required only in respect to the Common Foreign and Security Policy, as well as in situations when ratification of a treaty or of a treaty amendment is required. Such a form may thus be described as a semi-intergovernmental confederation.

However, some academic observers more usually discuss the EU in the terms of it being a federation. As the international law professor Joseph H. H. Weiler (of the Hague Academy and New York University) wrote, "Europe has charted its own brand of constitutional federalism". Jean-Michel Josselin and Alain Marciano see the European Court of Justice in Luxembourg City as being a primary force behind the building of a federal legal order for the EU, with Josselin stating that a "complete shift from a confederation to a federation would have required to straight-forwardly replace the principality of the member states vis-à-vis the Union by that of the European citizens. As a consequence, both confederate and federate features coexist in the judicial landscape". Rutgers political science professor R. Daniel Kelemen said: "Those uncomfortable using the 'F' word in the EU context should feel free to refer to it as a quasi-federal or federal-like system. Nevertheless, the EU has the necessary attributes of a federal system. It is striking that while many scholars of the EU continue to resist analyzing it as a federation, most contemporary students of federalism view the EU as a federal system". Thomas Risse and Tanja A. Börzel claim that the "EU only lacks two significant features of a federation. First, the Member States remain the "masters" of the treaties, i.e., they have the exclusive power to amend or change the constitutive treaties of the EU. Second, the EU lacks a real "tax and spend" capacity, in other words, there is no fiscal federalism".

Valéry Giscard d'Estaing, the chairman of the body of experts commissioned to elaborate a constitutional charter for the European Union, was confronted with strong opposition from the United Kingdom towards including the words "federal" or "federation" in the unratified European Constitution and the word was replaced with either "Community" or "Union".

A majority of the Political Groups in the European Parliament, including the EPP, the S&D Group and Renew Europe, support a federal model for the European Union. The ECR Group argues for a reformed European Union along confederal lines. The Brothers of Italy party, led by Giorgia Meloni, campaigns for a confederal Europe. On her election as President of the ECR Party in September 2020 Meloni said, "Let us continue to fight together for a confederate Europe of free and sovereign states".

Indigenous confederations in North America

In the context of the history of the indigenous peoples of the Americas, a confederacy may refer to a semi-permanent political and military alliance consisting of multiple nations (or "tribes", "bands", or "villages"), which maintained their separate leadership. One of the most well-known is the Haudenosaunee (or Iroquois), but there were many others during different eras and locations across North America, such as the Wabanaki Confederacy, Western Confederacy, Powhatan, Seven Nations of Canada, Pontiac's Confederacy, Illinois Confederation, Tecumseh's Confederacy, Great Sioux Nation, Blackfoot Confederacy, Iron Confederacy and Council of Three Fires.

The Haudenosaunee Confederacy, historically known as the Iroquois League or the League of Five (later Six) Nations, is the country of Native Americans (in what is now the United States) and First Nations (in what is now Canada) that consists of six nations: the Mohawk, the Oneida, the Onondaga, the Cayuga, the Seneca and the Tuscarora. The Six Nations have a representative government known as the Grand Council which is the oldest governmental institution still maintaining its original form in North America. Each clan from the five nations sends chiefs to act as representatives and make decisions for the whole confederation. It has been operating since its foundation in 1142 despite limited international recognition today.

Serbia and Montenegro
In 2003, Federal Republic of Yugoslavia was transformed into the State Union of Serbia and Montenegro, a confederation of the Republic of Montenegro and the Republic of Serbia. The state was constituted as a loose political union, but formally functioned as a sovereign subject of international law, and member of the United Nations. As a confederation, the State Union of Serbia and Montenegro had very few shared functions, such as defense, foreign affairs and a weak common president, ministerial council and parliament.

The two constituent republics functioned separately throughout the period of its short existence, and they continued to operate under separate economic policies and to use separate currencies (the euro was and still is the only legal tender in Montenegro, and the dinar was and still is the legal tender in Serbia). On 21 May 2006, the Montenegrin independence referendum was held. The final official results indicated on 31 May that 55.5% of voters voted in favor of independence. The confederation effectively came to an end after Montenegro's formal declaration of independence on 3 June 2006 and Serbia's formal declaration of independence on 5 June.

Switzerland
It had been a confederacy since its inception in 1291 as the Old Swiss Confederacy, which was originally created as an alliance among the valley communities of the central Alps, until it became a federation in 1848 but it retains the name of Confederacy for reasons of historical tradition. The confederacy facilitated management of common interests (such as freedom from external domination especially from the Habsburg Empire, the development of republican institutions in a Europe dominated by monarchies and free trade), and it ensured peace between the different cultural entities of the area.

After the Sonderbund War of 1847, when some of the Catholic cantons of Switzerland attempted to set up a separate union ( in German) against the Protestant majority, a vote was held and the majority of the cantons approved the new Federal Constitution which changed the political system to one of a federation.

Union State of Russia and Belarus

In 1999, Russia and Belarus signed a treaty to form a confederation, which came into force on 26 January 2000. Although it was given the name Union State, and has some characteristics of a federation, it remains a confederation of two sovereign states. Its existence has been seen as an indication of Russia's political and economic support for the Belarusian government. The confederation was created with the objective of co-ordinating common action on economic integration and foreign affairs. However, many of the treaty's provisions have not yet been implemented. Consequently, The Times, in 2020, described it as "a mostly unimplemented confederation".

Historical confederations 
Historical confederations (especially those predating the 20th century) may not fit the current definition of a confederation, may be proclaimed as a federation but be confederal (or the reverse), and may not show any qualities that 21st-century political scientists might classify as those of a confederation.

List
Some have more the characteristics of a personal union, but appear here because of their self-styling as a "confederation":

See also 
 Associated state
 Commonwealth
 Federalism
 Federation
 Supranational union
 List of confederations

References

Sources

External links 

 P.-J. Proudhon, The Principle of Federation, 1863.
 The Fathers of Confederation
 Confederation: The Creation of Canada 
 United Confederation of Taino People

Constitutional state types
Federalism
Political systems